Cavitt's Creek Park is a 300 acre park located at 750 Recreation Drive in North Tazewell, Tazewell County, Virginia. The lake is named for a local doctor and state politician. It features a 54 acre lake, stocked with fish; allows only non-motorized boats and has both full service and primitive camping. It is also a site for the Mountain Heritage Loop of the Virginia Birding and Wildlife Trail.

References

WVVA January 2, 2015 "Possible State Park in Tazewell County" by Travis Roberts, multimedia journalist; 
http://www.bdtonline.com/news/tazewell-county-hopes-cavitt-s-creek-will-become-state-park/article_6d5891a6-518e-11e4-b214-6f0d342fb6f2.html
http://www.bdtonline.com/news/officials-seek-to-designate-cavitt-s-creek-a-state-park/article_5f456190-9f93-11e4-bbd9-c70695f6d859.html

External links
 

Virginia municipal and county parks
Protected areas of Tazewell County, Virginia